Bernardin Ledoux Kingue Matam (born 20 May 1990) is a French weightlifter who competes in the men's lightweight division (-69 kg). He is part of the La Francaise de Besançon club in Besançon, France. His coach is Didier Boiston. He participated in the 2011 World Weightlifting Championships and came in seventh. He represented France in the 2012 Olympics and 2016 Olympics. He also competed in the men's 67 kg event at the 2020 Summer Olympics in Tokyo, Japan.

Personal
Three of his brothers are also international weightlifters who competed at the Olympic Games. That are Alphonse Hercule Matam (1992), Samson N'Dicka-Matam (1996, 2000 and 2004) and David Matam (2004).

References

External links
 
 
 
 
 

1990 births
Living people
French male weightlifters
Cameroonian male weightlifters
French sportspeople of Cameroonian descent
Olympic weightlifters of France
Weightlifters at the 2012 Summer Olympics
Weightlifters at the 2016 Summer Olympics
Weightlifters at the 2020 Summer Olympics
African Games gold medalists for Cameroon
African Games medalists in weightlifting
Sportspeople from Yaoundé
Universiade medalists in weightlifting
World Weightlifting Championships medalists
African Games bronze medalists for Cameroon
Competitors at the 2007 All-Africa Games
Universiade silver medalists for France
European Weightlifting Championships medalists
Medalists at the 2013 Summer Universiade
20th-century French people
21st-century French people